Thuntata is a 2002 Kannada romantic-comedy film directed by Indrajit Lankesh featuring Anirudh, Rekha Vedavyas and Chaya Singh. The film released on 24 May 2002. The film won the V Shantaram Award for Best Debut Director. The film was shot at a Bengaluru college.

Cast

 Anirudh as Sachin
 Rekha Vedavyas as Aishwarya
 Chaya Singh as Priyanka
 Umashree as 'Lingo' Leela
 Tennis Krishna 
 Kashi as Mr.Menasinakayi
 Mandya Ramesh as Mandya
 Harish
 Niranjan Shetty 
 Haridas G. 
 Ramakrishna as Sachin's Father
 Vanitha Vasu as Sachin's Mother
 Gandasi Nagaraj 
 Gundlupete Suresh
 Saurav Lokesh
 Jai Jagadish 
 Guru Kiran 
 Hosmane Murthy 
 Akarsh 
 Yogendran
 Sudeep  (Guest Appearance in a song)
 Indrajith Lankesh as Special Appearance 
 Nagathihalli Chandrashekhar as Special Appearance

Production 
The film was shot in Bangalore, Goa, Mangalore and Mysore.

Soundtrack
The music was composed by Gurukiran and released by Ashwini Recording Company.

References

External links
 

2002 films
2000s Kannada-language films
Films scored by Gurukiran
Films directed by Indrajit Lankesh